Cleveland is an unincorporated community in Greenville County, South Carolina, United States. The population was 1,347 at the 2020 census. Cleveland has a post office with ZIP code 29635, which opened on April 9, 1900.

Demographics
As of the 2020 census, 1,347 people, 586 households and 438 families resided in Cleveland. 18.5% of the family households included children, while 68% were married couples with no children. 148 households were non-family; 5.7% of these consisted of a single householder with children while 7.5% consisted of a single householder with no children.

The racial demographic of the community was 96.1% white and 1.5% black, while all other races accounted for less than 1%. Hispanics and Latinos of any race accounted for 0.5% of the population.

References

Unincorporated communities in Greenville County, South Carolina
Unincorporated communities in South Carolina